Logania is a genus of jawless fish which lived during the Silurian and Early Devonian period.

Like other thelodonts, the body was covered in denticles, which in Logania were interlocking and stud-like.

References

Thelodonti genera
Paleozoic jawless fish
Devonian extinctions
Silurian first appearances